Ardal O'Hanlon (born 8 October 1965) is an Irish comedian, actor, and author. He played Father Dougal McGuire in Father Ted (1995–1998), George Sunday/Thermoman in My Hero (2000–2005), and DI Jack Mooney in Death in Paradise (2017–2020). His novel The Talk of the Town was published in 1998.

Early life
O'Hanlon was born on 8 October 1965 in Carrickmacross, County Monaghan, the son of Fianna Fáil TD and physician Rory O'Hanlon and Teresa (née Ward). He is the third of six children, and has three brothers and two sisters. The episode of Who Do You Think You Are? which aired on 6 October 2008 revealed that O'Hanlon's paternal grandfather, Michael O'Hanlon, was a medical student at University College Dublin (UCD) who had joined the Irish Republican Army during the Irish War of Independence and was a member of Michael Collins's Squad, which assassinated British secret service agents on the morning of Bloody Sunday. Details of his grandfather's activities survive in UCD Archives, as well as Blackrock College. It also transpired that, on his mother's side, he is a close relative of Peter Fenelon Collier.

O'Hanlon was schooled in Blackrock College in Dublin and graduated, in 1987, from the National Institute for Higher Education, Dublin (now Dublin City University), with a degree in communications studies.

Career
Together with Kevin Gildea and Barry Murphy, O'Hanlon founded the International Comedy Cellar, upstairs in the International Bar on Dublin's South Wicklow Street. Dublin had no comedy scene at the time. As a stand up, O'Hanlon won the Hackney Empire New Act of the Year competition in 1994. For a time he was the presenter of The Stand Up Show.

He was spotted by Graham Linehan, who was to cast him as Father Dougal McGuire in Father Ted (1995–98). During filming, O’Hanlon went to buy shoes. Still being in costume, the seller thought he was a real priest and offered the footwear for free. In 1995 he received the Top TV Comedy Newcomer at the British Comedy Awards for this role. In 1995, he appeared (as Father Dougal) in a Channel 4 ident ("Hello, you're watching ... television"), and during Comic Relief on BBC1. This was followed by the award-winning short comedy film Flying Saucer Rock'n'Roll. In a 2019 interview, O'Hanlon admitted that he had attempted to distance himself from Father Ted once the show had finished.

O'Hanlon moved into straight acting alongside Emma Fielding and Beth Goddard in the ITV comedy-drama Big Bad World, which aired for two series in summer 1999 and winter 2001. He also played a minor role in The Butcher Boy as Joe's (Francie's best friend) father, and appeared in an episode of the original Whose Line is it Anyway?.

In 2000, O'Hanlon starred in the comedy series My Hero, in which he played a very naive superhero from the planet Ultron. His character juggled world-saving heroics with life in suburbia. He stayed in the role until the first episode of series 6 in July 2006, when he was replaced by James Dreyfus during the same episode.

O'Hanlon also provided the voice of the lead character in the three Christmas television cartoon specials of Robbie the Reindeer. He appeared in the 2005 BBC One sitcom Blessed, written by Ben Elton; at the 2005 British Comedy Awards, it was publicly slated by Jonathan Ross, albeit in jest. Towards the end of 2005, he played an eccentric Scottish character, Coconut Tam, in the family based film, The Adventures of Greyfriars Bobby. He has also appeared on radio, including an appearance on Quote... Unquote on  BBC Radio 4 on 18 July 2011. Appropriately, one of his questions concerned a quotation from Father Ted. In 2015, he appeared as incompetent angel Smallbone in the sitcom The Best Laid Plans, on the same channel.

In 2006, O'Hanlon wrote and presented an RTÉ television series called Leagues Apart, which saw him investigate the biggest and most passionate football rivalries in a number of European countries. Included were Roma vs Lazio in Italy, Barcelona vs Real Madrid in Spain, and Galatasaray vs Fenerbahce in Turkey. He followed this with another RTÉ show, So You Want To Be Taoiseach? in 2007. It was a political series in which O'Hanlon gave tongue-in-cheek advice on how to go about becoming Taoiseach of Ireland.

He appeared in the Doctor Who episode "Gridlock", broadcast on 14 April 2007, in which he played a catlike creature named Thomas Kincade Brannigan. O'Hanlon appears in series 3 of the TV show Skins, playing Naomi Campbell (Lily Loveless)'s politics teacher named Kieran, who attempted to kiss her. He then went on to form a relationship with Naomi's mother (Olivia Colman). O'Hanlon plays the lead role in Irish comedy television programme Val Falvey, TD on RTÉ One. He has recently performed in the Edinburgh Fringe.

In February 2011, O'Hanlon returned to the Gate Theatre, Dublin starring in the Irish premiere of Christopher Hampton's translation of Yasmina Reza's God of Carnage, alongside Maura Tierney. Later that year, he appeared in the comedy panel show Argumental.

O'Hanlon has written a novel, The Talk of the Town (known in the United States as Knick Knack Paddy Whack), which was published in 1998. The novel is about a teenage boy, Patrick Scully, and his friends.

In February 2015 he officially launched the 2015 Sky Cat Laughs Comedy Festival, which took place in Kilkenny from 28 May–1 June. In 2015 he played the role of Peter the Milkman in the Sky One sitcom After Hours.

On 2 February 2017, it was announced he would play the lead role in the BBC crime drama Death in Paradise taking the role of DI Jack Mooney following Kris Marshall's departure the same day. He announced his intention to leave the series in early 2020 and was replaced by Ralf Little.

On 25 November 2021, it was announced that he would participate in series 13 of Taskmaster. He finished in 4th place ahead of Judi Love.

Personal life
O'Hanlon met his wife Melanie as a teenager. They have three children. He is a supporter of Leeds United.

Filmography

Awards

References

External links
 
 
 Ardal O'Hanlon on comedycv.co.uk
 Ardal O'Hanlon in Melbourne at The Australian Ireland Fund charity event

1965 births
20th-century Irish comedians
21st-century Irish comedians
Living people
Alumni of Dublin City University
Father Ted
Irish humorists
Irish male comedians
Irish male stage actors
Irish male television actors
Irish novelists
Irish stand-up comedians
People educated at Blackrock College
People from Carrickmacross
Irish male novelists